Gru is the protagonist of the Despicable Me animated film series.

GRU or Gru may also refer to:

GRU, Russia's foreign-intelligence service

Arts and entertainment
 Gru (rapper), Serbian rapper
 Gru, an antagonist in The Kine Saga

Organizations

Georgia
 Georgia Rugby Union
 Grigol Robakidze University

Poland
 Growth Research Unit, Cracow University of Economics

Soviet Union and Russia
 GRU (Soviet Union), Soviet military intelligence service
 Spetsnaz GRU, Russian army special forces

United States
 Gainesville Regional Utilities, Florida
 Georgia Regents University, Georgia
 Georgia Rugby Union (United States)

Science and technology
 Gated recurrent unit, mechanisms in recurrent neural networks
 Abbreviation for the constellation Grus

Standardized codes
 GRU, IATA airport code of São Paulo–Guarulhos International Airport, Brazil
 gru, ISO 639-3 language code of the Soddo language

See also
 Grue (disambiguation)
 Grus (disambiguation)
 Groo (disambiguation)
 Grew, a surname
 Grewe, a surname